Anthony Coyle may refer to:

Anthony Coyle, Bishop of Raphoe  who served between 1782 and 1801
Tony Coyle (born 1976), South African international football defender
Tony Coyle (Scottish footballer) (born 1960), Scottish football winger (Albion Rovers, Stockport County, Chesterfield)
Anthony Coyle (American football) (born 1996), American football player
A man killed in Scotland in 2004 during the House of Blood murders